Mehadrin, higher standards of kashruth
 Mehadrin Dairy Corporation, an American Chalav Yisrael dairy company
 Mehadrin bus lines, an Israeli bus company
 Mehadrin min hamehadrin, the best way to light the Chanukah menorah